This is a discography for the American blues band Hot Tuna. In addition to 7 studio albums and 14 live albums, the group has released many of their live concerts directly for sale on iTunes.

Studio albums

Live albums

Archival live albums

Compilation albums

Collaborations between members

References

Blues discographies
Discographies of American artists